Edwinstowe railway station is a former railway station in Edwinstowe, Nottinghamshire, England.

History
The station was opened by the Lancashire, Derbyshire and East Coast Railway in 1896 and closed by British Railways on 2 January 1956, though the last train ran on 31 December 1955.

The station buildings and signalbox followed the company's standard modular architecture pattern.

Context
From  the line entered the valley of the River Maun with Sherwood Forest visible to the north. This was, and is, an area known as The Dukeries, heavily promoted in the railway's literature in the hope of attracting tourist trade. This never materialised in LD&ECR days, but the success of the modern-day Center Parcs near to Edwinstowe suggests the company had the right idea at the wrong time.

Former services
There never was a Sunday service at Edwinstowe.

Two services called at Edwinstowe in 1922:

Three trains per day plied between Chesterfield Market Place and Lincoln with a market day extra on Fridays between Langwith Junction and Lincoln. All these trains called at all stations. The truncated remains of this service ended in September 1955.

Three trains per day terminated at Ollerton from Nottingham Victoria via Mansfield Central then went back again half an hour or so later, calling at Edwinstowe in both directions. A fourth train from Nottingham didn't go through to Ollerton, but turned round at Edwinstowe. The service through to Ollerton was later cut back to Edwinstowe. A fifth train ran to Nottingham Victoria Monday to Friday, but on Saturdays it started from Lincoln and ran through to Leicester Central. This service did not survive the Second World War.

The Edwinstowe-Mansfield Central-Nottingham Victoria service outlived the LD&ECR "Main Line" service to Lincoln by three and a half months, closing on 2 January 1956, though the last train ran on Saturday 31 December 1955. This meant that Edwinstowe was the last LD&ECR station to have a regular, timetabled passenger service.

Excursions and Summer Weekend holiday traffic continued until September 1964.

Coal
When the line was built Edwinstowe was still in open countryside. Subsequently, deep mining techniques were perfected to penetrate the limestone cap, enabling new collieries to be opened. A branch was built a little way to the east to serve Thoresby Colliery, one of the most productive mines at the time.

Modern times
The line through the station site gives access from Shirebrook to UK Coal's Thoresby Colliery and to the High Marnham Test Track.

The future
There have been hypothetical suggestions of reopening the line as a branch off the Robin Hood Line and reopening Warsop, Edwinstowe and Ollerton stations, providing an hourly service to Mansfield and Nottingham.

References

Notes

Sources

External links
Edwinstowe railway station on navigable 1947 O.S. Map npe Maps

Disused railway stations in Nottinghamshire
Former Lancashire, Derbyshire and East Coast Railway stations
Railway stations in Great Britain opened in 1896
Railway stations in Great Britain closed in 1964
Edwinstowe